Singing in the Trees is the third studio album by Claire Kuo.  It was released on 22 May 2009 by Linfair Records.

Track listing
Singing in the Trees / 在樹上唱歌
Understand / 明白
Heart Wall / 心牆
Find Fault / 牛角尖
Simple / 簡單 (Jiǎndān)
Goodbye 
Mona Lisa / 蒙娜麗莎
Trilogy / 三部曲
Don't Say / 不說 (Bù shuō)
See / 看見

DVD
Singing in the Trees / 在樹上唱歌 MV
Understand / 明白 MV 
Heart Wall / 心牆 MV
Simple / 簡單 MV
Goodbye MV

References
The album on Linfair Records website

2009 albums
Claire Kuo albums